The Upper Siang Hydroelectric Project consists of the construction of several hydroelectric power dams in the Upper Siang district of Arunachal Pradesh, India. Construction work on the project was commenced by the National Hydroelectric Power Corporation (NHPC) in April 2009 and various hydro dams will be constructed in phases over a span of 15–20 years.

The main dam is being constructed across river Siang, a tributary of river Brahmaputra and upon completion, the dam reservoir will hold 10 billion cubic meters of water. The hydro power project at Siang will alone generate between 10,000 and 12,000 MW, making it the largest hydroelectric dam in the Indian Subcontinent.

Concerns

Concern on Upstream Flooding
In 2006, Indian media reported that the NHPC was planning to relocate and scale down the project due to concerns on flooding upstream by Chinese government. However, the Arunachal Pradesh government has awarded contracts and commenced work on the project as per initial plans.

The state government of Arunachal Pradesh signed deals with various Indian power companies to develop hydro projects. A total of 42 schemes are planned to generate electricity in excess of 27,000 MW with the Upper Siang project being one of them.

Environmental impact
In 2010, a student body appealed to India's Environment Ministry to scrap various hydroelectric projects (including Siang project) in Assam and Arunachal Pradesh due to potential adverse environmental impact. However, the Ministry remarked that though the projects will not be cancelled, necessary precautions will be undertaken to ensure minimal environmental impact.

References

External links

HYDRO POWER PROJECTS IN ARUNACHAL PRADESH

Hydroelectric power stations in Arunachal Pradesh
Dams in Arunachal Pradesh
Dams in the Brahmaputra River Basin
Upper Siang district
Proposed infrastructure in Arunachal Pradesh